KG0516 is the third studio album by Colombian singer Karol G, released on March 25, 2021, by Universal Music Latin Entertainment. Consisting of sixteen tracks, the album was preceded by the commercially successful and Latin Grammy-nominated single "Tusa" with Nicki Minaj, "Ay, Dios Mio!", "Bichota", and "Location" which features vocals by Anuel AA and J Balvin. It also includes guest appearances by Mariah Angeliq, Camilo, Nathy Peluso, Ozuna, Yandar & Yostin, Juanka, Brray, Ludacris, Emilee, Wisin & Yandel, Nicky Jam, Ivy Queen, Zion and Alberto Stylee.

Background
The title KG0516 references a combination of digits, dates, and initials, recalling the moment Karol G and her parents signed her first major contract under her stage name. “My parents signed a contract on my behalf on May 16th, 2006 and that was the first time that my name as ‘Karol G’ was written”.

On November 7, 2019, Karol G released "Tusa" with American artist Nicki Minaj, which received immediate commercial success. Following this, the singer stated she was ready to embark on a world tour, but due to the varying international lockdowns (as safety against COVID-19, these plans were momentarily postponed after just one show.

On July 6, 2020 Karol G released "Ay, Dios Mio!" as the second single from the album and "Bichota" was later released on October 23, 2020 as the third single. Both singles were also received with immediate success. 
The following year, on February 12, 2021, "Location" (featuring Anuel AA and J. Balvin) was released as the last single prior to the album’s release.

On March 16, 2021, Karol G announced via a half-minute video the release date of the album alongside its title, while the cover art, which was photographed by David LaChapelle,  was released the next day. 
The tracklist was revealed the following week, revealing guest appearances from Mariah Angeliq, Camilo, Nathy Peluso, Ozuna , Yandar & Yostin, Juanka, Brray, Ludacris, Emilee, Wisin & Yandel, Nicky Jam, Ivy Queen, Zion and Alberto Stylee.

The album was released on March 25, 2021, alongside the release of "El Makinon" (featuring Mariah Angeliq), as the fifth single from the album. "El Barco" would follow up shortly as the sixth single from the album. The regional Mexican corrido, "200 Copas" was released as the final single from the album.

Critical reception

Thom Jurek from AllMusic praised Giraldo’s ability to blend in multiple genres, stating, “KG0516 establishes Karol G as a visionary; she pushes hard at urbano's boundaries, blending them into the pop multiverse, only to bring the album's many dimensions to heel under reggaeton's dominance.”

Commercial performance
KG0516 debuted at number one on the US Top Latin Albums chart, earning 24,000 album-equivalent units (including 4,000 copies in pure album sales) in its first week. The album also debuted at number 20 on the US Billboard 200 and number one on the US Latin Rhythm Albums charts respectively. This became Karol G's first number one debut on the Latin charts and her highest charting album to date on the Billboard 200. In addition, the album also accumulated a total of 27.4 million on-demand streams from its songs.

On November 24, 2021, the album was certified eleven times platinum by the Latin Recording Industry Association of America (RIAA) for combined sales and album-equivalent units of over 660,000 units in the United States, becoming her first album to achieve Latin Diamond certification. Furthermore, fifteen out of the sixteen tracks were also certified Latin Gold or higher by the RIAA.

Accolades

Track listing

All songs produced by Ovy on the Drums, except where noted.

Charts

Weekly charts

Year-end charts

Certifications

References

2021 albums
Karol G albums
Spanish-language albums
Universal Music Latino albums
Albums produced by Ovy on the Drums